Lucie Eyenga was a vocalist, and one of the early pioneers of soukous music. She was born in Bandaka (then Coquelathville) in the Belgian Congo.

She was discovered in 1954 by virtuoso guitarist Zacharie Elenga "Jhimmy," and was signed to the Opika label.

At Opika, she proved herself to be an improvisational and expressive singer, as well as an accomplished musical arranger. Her songs placed an emphasis on vocal harmonies, and hits such as Ohé Suka ya Rhumba and Mokili Makalamba endeared her to a generation. She was soon noticed by Joseph Kabasélé, and her reputation continued to grow as a member of the orchestra African Jazz between 1954 and 1956.  Towards the end of the 1950s with the close of the Opika label, Eyenga transitioned to the Esengo label as did many colleagues of the time. Her career continued to reach new heights between 1957 and 1958 with the orchestra Rock-A-Mambo where she contributed to such hits as Brigitte, Mabe na yo moko, Dit moninga, Nasepeli mingi, and Zozo moke. Following the closing of Editions Esengo and the breakup of Rock-a-Mambo, in 1960 her career took a brief hiatus until she reappeared in Brazzaville with the orchestra Negro Band where she recorded the memorable songs Adoula and Georgette. In 1983 she again resurfaced to play with Nico Kasanda's l’African Fiesta Sukisa.

The congolese music scene lost one of its greatest female voices of all time on December 12, 1987, when Lucie Eyenga died in Kinshasa.

References

Soukous musicians
20th-century Democratic Republic of the Congo women singers
1934 births
1987 deaths